The Capulí culture refers to an archaeological classification for a group in Pre-Columbian South America on the Andean plain in what is now northern Ecuador and southern Colombia. The Capulí preceded the Piartal and Tuza cultures in the archaeological record ranging from around 800 to 1500 CE. The Capulí culture left a strong record through its pottery. The Capulí had distinctive black on dark red pottery with rectilinear geometric designs. The anthropomorphic pottery statues of the Capulí can be striking. Women are depicted with a wrap that extends from the armpit to the ankle while men have loincloths and are often shown with an object such as a drum or animal. These figures are often called coqueros because they are depicted with wads of coca leaves in their mouths. Scholars have associated the figures with shamans and possible funerary rituals.

Capulí goldwork is similar to that of later Ecuadoran and Columbian cultures. Smiths hammered and soldered high-carat gold into geometric and zoomorphic designs. The most abstract Precolumbian works in gold come from the Capulí era in the Colombian/Ecuadorian highlands. 

Capulí graves contained a mix of grave goods including conch shells and stone axes.

Nariño

Nariño culture refers to the culture of people who once lived in communities in the mountains of Nariño, Colombia from 800 to 1500 AD. They also harvested Quinoa and raised Llamas for agriculture and trade.

They made artwork out of materials such as wood, strings, and wool. Their work sometimes took the form of shaft burials. Their pottery reached important artistic development, being recognizable by its forms and decoration, emphasizing the negative painting or positive bicolor. Their jewelry work stands out for the large gold pectorals, nose rings, discs and plaques, all made with fine gold sheets and with complex geometric designs.

Graves
Some graves in Nariño are extremely deep, as much as 40m.  Those Carchi only exceeded 10m in the early Capulí period and were later only 2m deep. Graves were ellipsoid in shape, wider than deep, and burial chambers seem to have been kept open while tunnels were backfilled.

See also 
 List of pre-Columbian cultures
 Pre-Columbian cultures of Colombia

References

External links
 Capulí page at the Chilean Museum for Pre-Columbian Art website

Pre-Columbian cultures
Indigenous peoples of the Andes
History of Ecuador
History of Peru